Ponaka Kanakamma (1892–1963) was a social worker, activist and freedom fighter, imprisoned over a year, as a disciple of Mahatma Gandhi, in India.
She founded Sri Kasturidevi Vidyalam, a large school for girls in Nellore.

Early life
Ponaka Kanakamma was born in Nellore district, on 10 June 1892 at Minagallu. Her father was Marupooru Konda Reddy and mother: Kaamamma.

Career

She hailed from a very rich landlord community. She married her maternal uncle Subbarama Reddy, a rich landlord from Potlapudi Village, near Nellore. She was eight years old at the time of her marriage. As her husband was traditional, she was not allowed to attend school. Though she had no formal schooling, she acquired proficiency in Telugu, Hindi and Sanskrit by her own efforts. In 1907, when BipinChandraPal and his wife visited Nellore in connection with 'Vande Mataram Movement', she hosted the couple. At that time, she was only 16 years of age. With the help of her youngest brother-in-law Pattabhiramareddy, who was involved in Library movement, she established "Sujana Ranjani samajam" and "Vivekananda Granthalayam" in Potlapudi village, near Nellore to serve the society. Her friends started libraries in nearby villages Pogadadoruvu kandrika and Kotturu. She worked for the uplift of Harijan (outcaste) and poor. 

From 1916 to 1919 for a brief period, she was under the spell of revolutionary politics and later became the ardent disciple of Mahatma Gandhi. She purchased 13 acres of land in Pallipadu village about 8 miles from Nellore on the banks of river Penna and handed over the land to her revolutionary friends for concealing fire arms and for firing practice. When she became the follower of Mahatma, she donated the land to establish the "Pinakini Satygrahasramam". Gandhiji inaugurated the "Pinakini Satyagraha Ashram" on 7 April 1921. Chaturuvedula Krishnaiah (C.V.Krishna), Digumarti Hanumanta Rao, his wife Krishnabai and Kondiparti Punnaya were the founder Members of the Ashram.

Kanakamma participated in non-cooperation movement and in Salt Satyagraha. She underwent six months rigorous imprisonment in 1930  in  Rayavellore prison and in 1932 imprisoned in  Rayavellore for 13 months. Rajajee, Durgabai, Bejawada Gopala Reddy and many other important freedom fighters were her co prisoners.

Under Gandhiji's constructive programme, Kanakamma founded Sri "Kasturidevi Vidyalam" (School for girls) on Vijayadasami Day in 1923. It was inaugurated by Sri Tanguturi Prakasam Pantulu. Gandhiji laid the foundation stone for the permanent building of the school on 12 May 1929. In 1944 Kanakamma exchanged 1-5 acres of the school site, in Pogatota Nelore for a sprawling 20 acre of land in the outskirts of Nellore and a school building was built in this site with the donation made by Sri tikkvarapu Ramireddy in around 1947 or so.  Kasturi devi Vidyalam campus, is the living monument for Kanakamma. For some time, she acted as a member of AICC.

She also acted as vice-president of Andhra Congress committee. After she lost her only daughter, M.Venkatasubbamma in 1934, who was a budding writer and social worker, she became a devotee of Ramana Maharshi and Ramayogi of Annareddy palem. Ponaka Kanakamma and Dronamraju Lakshmibaiyamma were the first twin poetesses in Telugu. They wrote several philosophical poems on Ramana Maharshi - important ones are Aradhana and Nivedyam. They translated essence of Bhagavadgita into Telugu by name Gnana Netram. She wrote the auto-biography of Sri Rama Yogi, both in Telugu and English. Kankamma was an accomplished write and her writings appeared in Bharati, Krishnapatrika, Grihalakshmi, Anasuya, Hindusundari Jaminryot and in many other journals. She lost her property due to the tyranny and repression of Venkatagiri Zameendar. She established in 1952 an industrial training centre for poor, orphan and under-privileged women. 

During her life, she hosted many eminent freedom fighters and poets at her residence in Potalpudi and in Nellore. National leaders like Babu Rajendraprasad, Desabandhu Chittaranjan Dass, artists Udayasanker, Atreya, Sthanam, Tiruvankur sisters and many others were her guests. She is the recipient of the Gruhlakshmi Swarnakankanam Sanmanam (award felicitation). On the occasion of the silver jubilee celebrations of Madras Mahila Sabha organisation, Smt. Durga Bhai Deshmukh honored Kanakamma with a silver plank. Kankamma and all other her family members are writers, whose writings are found in Bharati and in other magazines. Her youngest brother "Kala Prapurna" Marupuru Kodandarami Reddy is a famous journalist and noted writer.

She founded the Jameen Raitu, a Telugu weekly at Nellore in support of Zameendari Raitu movement in Nellore district.

Kanakamma died in Nellore, on 15 September 1963.

Her autobiography in Telugu, Kanakapushyaragam, was edited by Dr. K. Purushotham and published by Mannem Rayudu of Manasu Foundation in 2011. On Gandhi Jayanti in 2017, Kanakammas's bronze statue was erected on the premises of Pinakini Satyagrahasrmam, Pallipadu by the Ashram Committee.

References

Sources
Jamiinraitu (Telugu Weekly), 1931–1980
Vikramasimhapuri Mandala Sarvasvam-3
A biography of Kanakamma written by Raavinootala Sri Ramulu published in the year 2006.
Kanakapushyaraagam, an autobiography of Ponaka Kanakamma edited by Dr. K. Purushotham and published by Manasu Foundarion in the year 2011.
Reddy Rani Monthly Journal Volumes.
Grihalakshmi, Hidusundari, Bharathi and Krishna Patrika Volumes.
Anasuya, Telugu Monthly volumes
Andhra Jyoti, Sunday supplement.
Subodhini, Nellore local Telugu weekly.

External links

1892 births
1963 deaths
People from Nellore district
Indian National Congress politicians from Andhra Pradesh
Women in Andhra Pradesh politics
Social workers
Indian independence activists from Andhra Pradesh
Gandhians
Telugu women writers
Telugu writers
Telugu politicians
20th-century Indian politicians
20th-century Indian women writers
Writers from Andhra Pradesh
Indian women educational theorists
Indian women activists
20th-century Indian women scientists
20th-century Indian educational theorists
20th-century Indian translators
Women writers from Andhra Pradesh
Women Indian independence activists
20th-century Indian women politicians
Scholars from Andhra Pradesh
Women scientists from Andhra Pradesh
Indian women translators
Women autobiographers
Indian autobiographers
Indian women non-fiction writers
Indian women scholars
Social workers from Andhra Pradesh
Women educators from Andhra Pradesh
Educators from Andhra Pradesh
20th-century women educators
School founders
Women founders